Buckellacris nuda, or Buckell's timberline grasshopper, is a species of spur-throated grasshopper in the family Acrididae. It is found in North America.

Subspecies
These two subspecies belong to the species Buckellacris nuda:
 Buckellacris nuda nuda (E. M. Walker, 1889) i c g
 Buckellacris nuda relicta Rehn and Rehn, 1945 i c g
Data sources: i = ITIS, c = Catalogue of Life, g = GBIF, b = Bugguide.net

References

Melanoplinae
Articles created by Qbugbot
Insects described in 1889